Class 207M is a prototype series of Polish light Diesel Multiple Units (a.k.a. railcars). Only six were made in following configurations:
 two cars - a set of 207M power car and 207Mr trailer-control car (PKP designation SA101+SA121)
 three cars - a set of: 207Ma power car, 207Mra trailer car, 207Mb power car (PKP designation SA102+SA111+SA102)

History 
By the end of the 1970s, steam traction in Poland was mostly retired. Non-electrified lines became operated with diesel locomotives. For short distance passenger traffic (mainly suburban trains) PKP was seeking a more economical solution than a heavy diesel locomotive pulling few cars. The obvious solution was the use of railcars. However, due to politics-related economical problems Poland was facing in 1980s, it wasn't until 1990 that the first cars were produced.

The class 207M was developed in ZNTK Poznań by a team led by Polish renowned rail transport engineer Ryszard Suwalski. The concept prospected trains from one up to four cars in consist. Only 2- and 3-car versions were made, three of each. Again, due to economical difficulties class 207M never went into serious production. After 2001 a larger contingent of railcars/DMUs went into production and they were based on newer projects than 207M.

Technical data 

Diesel multiple units of Poland